Barbara Kluntz (born 5 February 1661 in Ulm; buried 22 May 1730 in Ulm) was a German composer and music teacher. On all of her book titles, she calls herself "Barbara Kluntz the Noble Music Art Lover", in order to explicitly emphasize her position: She did not consider herself a professional musician.

Biography 
Barbara Kluntz, called "Schneiderbärbele", was the daughter and third child of the tailor Peter Kluntz and his wife Katharina Kluntz, née Messerschmid. She joined the charitable Third Order of the Ulm Collection Women who were evangelicals after the Reformation. The monastery-like association also owned several villages around Ulm and was located on Ulmer Frauenstrasse at the corner of Sammlungsgasse. The building was destroyed in World War II.

Since the women who entered the order did not have to take any vows, Barbara Kluntz was not a nun.

Entry into the Ulm Collection Foundation 

When she entered the collection, Barbara Kluntz was widely known as a “piano virtuoso, organ player and poet”, according to older research. Excerpts from her will, which no longer exists, show that she had her own organ, a clavichord, many books, and music.

How Barbara Kluntz came to her skills and what position her father had as a tailor within the Ulm tailors' guild is not yet known. Until then, only patrician women had been included in the collection. Why Barbara Kluntz only joined the collection at the age of 44 remains to be explored. Her musical activities can only be documented when she joined the collection in 1704. So far, no evidence can be found about her childhood, early and late adolescence.

Barbara Kluntz was not married; she moved into the collection under her maiden name and as a "maid". Her vocal and instrumental music making was probably dedicated to purely religious purposes. She also taught her colleagues, their students and many patrician daughters, in "clavier-playing". Her great role model was the French poet Georgette de Montenay, whose portrait she had included in her chorale book from 1711.

Contacts and concerts 
Barbara Kluntz maintained contacts in Berlin through correspondence and probably had the latest musical works sent from there so that she could study and perform them. She probably accompanied herself and others herself on the clavichord and on the organ. Since the Ulm collection women were free to move around the city and in the monastery, it can be assumed that the Ulm collection was a center of Ulm music practice alongside the permanently employed Ulm city performers and the emerging theater business.

Poetry 
In addition to music, Barbara Kluntz also wrote many poems that she published in her chorale books, including a work that expresses her joy and vitality:

„Deß Davids Harpff in Himel klingt,
wol dem, der mit mir frölich singt.
Lutherus singt uns allen vor,
Nach Gottes Wort führt den Tenor.
Wir singen nach und zwitzern mit,
Und Gott nimt an solch Lob und Bitt.
Wer nun Gott fürcht und hat mich gern
der singt mit mir zu Gott dem Herrn.“ (Choralbuch 1711)

Barbara Kluntz must have been very familiar with the French language, as she quoted her role model Georgette de Montenay in her chorale book from 1711 and presumably knew their works in the original. With this, Barbara Kluntz entered a tradition of outstanding women who put their literary and musical talents and gifts into the service of the praise of God.

Choralbuch 1711 
The 245 chorales of the magnificently handwritten Choral Music book from 1711 are recorded only with title and partly without text. The melodies are set to chords with up to six voices, whereby the settings can suddenly switch between full voices and two-part passages. Occasionally, Barbara Kluntz also offers alternative suspensions to a chorale melody on the same page.

In her works, Barbara Kluntz often used the fifths and octaves in parallel, and the third is just as often missing in the movements despite four and five voices. This could be an indication that she learned her art auto-didactically, since the use of the third had long been common at this point in music history.

At the end of her first chorale book, Barbara Kluntz puts her happiest credo, her way of viewing music:

„Ich waiß nit z’sagen, wie vil Gut,
In Musica ist verborgen;
Gott und Menschen sie g’fallen thut,
Music vertreibt die Sorgen,
Music verjagt die Traurigkeit,
Music den Geist erneüet,
Music macht Lust, und kürzt die Zeit,
und ewig uns erfreüet.
Music lieb’ ich, so lang ich leb,
und frölich meine Stimm’ erheb,
und sing: O Music! Himmels Kunst,
du bist wehrt aller Ehr’ und Gunst.“ (Choralbuch 1711)

Posthumous situation 
It remains to be researched what happened to Barbara Kluntz's further legacy, such as the instruments and sheet music; a resolution of the city council of Ulm forbade the collection women to bequeath goods to one another in order to give them as little power and financial influence in the city as possible. Only a surviving excerpt from a (no longer preserved) artefact from the Ulm Collection Foundation, dated 10 December 1728, from the back of Barbara Kluntz's oil portrait, shows that she wrote a lost will at least two years before her death. Barbara Kluntz bequeathed her music (sheet music and clavichord) to the in-house chapel and decided that her organ should go to the Protestant church in Ersingen. However, after the Ulm collection was dissolved, the organ was (according to Ilse Schulz) taken to a "German school". Barbara Kluntz's music was probably destroyed in the Second World War by the bombing raids on Ulm, which destroyed the Ulm collection.

Archives 
Barbara Kluntz's grave is also considered lost. Only her two remaining chorale books and her portrait in oil by an unknown artist are preserved. There are also two pages of her second, missing chorale book from 1717. Barbara Kluntz was portrayed in the typical collection uniform of that time. With her left hand she points to a small cross; as she writes in almost all of her songs and poems, her music, which she holds in front of her as a chorale book, comes from God. Writing implements refer to her work as a poet and composer; a lemon in the foreground, which was a luxury item (shown in the original oil portrait, Ulmer Museum), signifies a high status. Her own organ is likely in the background.

The diverse activities of Barbara Kluntz as a collector, music teacher, composer, organist, and piano player are unparalleled for the Ulm area and in general for her age.

Works 

 3 Chorale books from 1711, 1717 (lost) und 1720; with a total of more than 500 individual compositions of sacred songs, chants and arias (Stadtarchiv Ulm).
 General Bass Büchlein (c. 1720?), lost.
 Laudet Jehova Te Ulma – Nine-strophic Latin hymn with the melody of Nun alle Gott as a hymn to Barbara Kluntz's hometown (Choralbuch 1711).
 Totenlied von Anna Maria Reiser (Sammlungsfrau) auf den Tod Barbara Kluntz‘, publiziert von Daniel Ringmacher in einem verschollenen Sammelband.
 Porträt der Barbara Kluntz von einem unbekannten Künstler (Ulmer Museum Inv.-Nr. 1928.6048).

Bibliography 

 Kirstin Börchers, Svenja Blocherer (Hrsg.): Ulmer Frauen haben eine Geschichte. Von tatkräftigen und klugen Frauen. Mössingen-Talheim 1992, ISBN 3-89376-029-6.
 Linda Maria Koldau: Frauen – Musik – Kultur. Ein Handbuch zum deutschen Sprachgebiet der Frühen Neuzeit. Wien 2005, ISBN 3-412-24505-4, S. 931–943.
 Christiane Dech: Barbara Kluntz – eine erfolgreiche Musikpädagogin. In: Ulmer Museum [Hrsg.]: Ulmer Bürgerinnen, Söflinger Klosterfrauen in reichsstädtischer Zeit. Ulm 2003, ISBN 3-928738-37-2.
 Ilse Schulz: Schwestern, Beginen, Meisterinnen. Hygieias christliche Töchter im Gesundheitswesen einer Stadt. Universitätsverlag, Ulm 1992, ISBN 3-927402-61-3.
 Ilse Schulz: Verwehte Spuren. Frauen in der Stadtgeschichte. Süddeutsche Verlagsgesellschaft, Ulm 1998, ISBN 3-88294-264-9, S. 17–43.
 Susanne Wosnitzka: „Music lieb ich solang ich leb“ – Barbara Kluntz, bedeutendste Komponistin Süddeutschlands um 1700. In: Archiv Frau und Musik, Frankfurt/Main (Hg.): VivaVoce, Nr. 97, Frankfurt 2013. S. 2–4.

1661 births
1730 deaths
German Baroque composers
German classical composers
German women classical composers